Hallan may refer to:

People
Notable people with this surname include:
 Gaute Hallan Steiwer (born 1990), Norwegian orienteering competitor
 John Hallan, Canadian merchant and alderman
 Kine Hallan Steiwer (born 1988), Norwegian orienteering competitor
 Toril Hallan, Norwegian ski-orienteering competitor

Places
 Loch Hallan, Outer Hebrides, Scotland